The Ghost Dance is a 1982 American Western slasher film directed and co-written by Peter F. Buffa, and starring Julie Amato, Victor Mohica, Henry Bal, and Frank Salsedo. Its plot follows a Native American shaman who becomes possessed by an evil spirit that drives him to kill. It was the first slasher film to be based around and feature Native American characters.

Plot
The spirit of a long-dead warrior, Nahalla, possesses Aranjo, a local Native American man, after an archaeologist, Dr. Kay Foster, unearths Nahalla's remains during an exploratory excavation. Through Aranjo, Nahalla exacts a murderous rampage.

Cast
 Julie Amato as Dr. Kay Foster
 Victor Mohica as Tom Eagle
 Henry Bal as Nahalla/Aranjo
 Frank Salsedo as Ocacio
 Felicia Leon as Rea
 Frank Soto as Basowaya
 Quentin Sondergaard as Campus Guard

Release

Home media
The film was released for the first time on DVD by Mediabox on April 24, 2006.

References

External links
 
 

1982 films
1980s slasher films
1980s Western (genre) horror films
1980s ghost films
American slasher films
American Western (genre) horror films
Films about archaeology
Films about Native Americans
Films about spirit possession
American films about revenge
1982 horror films
American exploitation films
Redsploitation
1980s English-language films
1980s American films